Jean Rogers Wallin is a politician and public official in New Hampshire. She served in the New Hampshire House of Representatives. She was a Democrat.

She was friends with Gloria Seldin. She lived in Nashua, New Hampshire.

She was appointed Chair of the New Hampshire State Liquor Commission in 1980. She donated a decanter commemorating the construction of the Sherman Adams Building on the summit of Mt. Washington to the New Hampshire Historical Society.

References

Democratic Party members of the New Hampshire House of Representatives
Women state legislators in New Hampshire
Politicians from Nashua, New Hampshire
20th-century American politicians
20th-century American women politicians